Pribeník is a village and municipality in the Trebišov District in the Košice Region of south-eastern Slovakia.

History
In historical records the village was first mentioned in 1323.

Geography
The village lies at an altitude of 100 metres and covers an area of 12.331 km2.
It has a population of about 960 people.

Ethnicity
The village is about 80% Hungarian and 20% Slovak.

Facilities
The village has a public library and a football pitch.

External links
http://www.pribenik.sk/
http://www.soupopribenik.edu.sk/
http://www.statistics.sk/mosmis/eng/run.html
 10th anniversary of the horse-racing

Villages and municipalities in Trebišov District